The Most Beautiful Month (French: Le mois le plus beau) is a 1968 French comedy drama film directed by Guy Blanc and starring Georges Géret, Michel Galabru and Muriel Baptiste.

Cast
 Georges Géret as Cyprien Boromès 
 Michel Galabru as Besson 
 Muriel Baptiste as Rosine 
 Magali Noël as Claudia 
 Yves Rénier as Bruno Besson 
 Jean Bouise as Le curé 
 Yves Robert as Le cheminot 
 Daniel Gélin as Le capitaine du Génie 
 Christian Marin  as Le sergent 
 Maxime Fabert  as Julien 
 Raoul Saint-Yves as Raoul 
 Josette Vardier as La conductrice du bus 
 Karamoko Cisse as Le Sénégalais

References

Bibliography 
 Monaco, James. The Encyclopedia of Film. Perigee Books, 1991.

External links 
 

1968 films
French comedy films
1968 comedy films
1960s French-language films
1960s French films